Gudusia chapra, or the Indian river shad, is a species of fish in the family Clupeidae, occurring in rivers of India and Bangladesh draining to the Bay of Bengal (e.g. the Ganges, Brahmaputra, Mahanadi River), and also reported from Pakistan and Nepal. Outside the rivers it also occurs in ponds, beels, ditches and inundated fields.

References

Alosinae
Fish of Bangladesh
Fish of Pakistan
Freshwater fish of India
Fish described in 1822
Taxa named by Francis Buchanan-Hamilton